James Heffernan (born 3 October 1979) is a former Irish Labour Party politician.

Background
He is from a Limerick hurling family, with his father and brother, both called Pat, having played for the county. Heffernan was heavily involved with Labour Youth during his time in university, serving on the organisation's internal disciplinary committee.

Career

Primary-school teacher
A graduate of the University of Limerick, Heffernan was a primary school teacher by profession. Before becoming a full-time politician in around 2009, Heffernan taught in a number of schools, including St Anne's in Whitechapel, London.

Labour politician
He was a candidate at 2007 general election for the Limerick West constituency. He was a member of Limerick County Council from 2009 to 2011 for the Kilmallock local electoral area. He was a candidate at the 2011 general election for the Limerick constituency, polling 7,910 first preference votes (17.5%). He was elected to the 24th Seanad in April 2011 on the Agricultural Panel for the Labour Party. 

He lost the parliamentary Labour Party whip in December 2012 after voting against the government on the Social Welfare Bill. The loss of the whip resulted in a falloff in Heffernan's Seanad voting attendance. In September 2013, it was reported that Heffernan attended only 23% of all votes in the Seanad, the second worst record.

Social Democrats
In February 2015, he claimed he was forming a new political party in order to oppose Sinn Féin. On 4 September 2015, the Social Democrats announced that Heffernan was one of their five election candidates.

Anti-social behaviour
Between 31 July 31 and 2 August 2016, Heffernan was allegedly arrested 3 times for offences including spitting at Gardaí, and drunken behaviour while attending Indiependence Music & Arts Festival in Mitchelstown, County Cork. In January 2019, he was found guilty of assaulting three Gardaí after he was arrested outside Indiependence in August 2016.

In April 2019, Heffernan was imprisoned for three months for the assault.

In 2020 he was accused of stealing a book on parliamentary debates, as well as a coat, from the Stephens Green Club.

See also
List of members of the Oireachtas imprisoned since 1923

References

1979 births
Living people
Alumni of the University of Limerick
Independent members of Seanad Éireann
Irish schoolteachers
Members of the 24th Seanad
Labour Party (Ireland) senators
Local councillors in County Limerick
Politicians from County Limerick
Social Democrats (Ireland) politicians